Rumex patientia, known as patience dock, garden patience, herb patience, or monk's rhubarb, is a herbaceous perennial flowering plant belonging to the family Polygonaceae. In spring it is often consumed as a leaf vegetable and as a filling in pies in Southern Europe, especially in Bulgaria, North Macedonia, Bosnia and Herzegovina and Serbia. It is also used in Romania in spring broths or sarmale.

Uses
The leaves can be eaten raw or cooked, but do contain oxalic acid, so should not be eaten in excess (e.g. every day). The leaves can be used raw in salads, cooked in soups and stews, or layered in baked dishes like lasagna. The leaves are high in minerals, and can be harvested at any time.

Gallery

References

External links
 
 
 

patientia
Flora of Southeastern Europe
Plants described in 1753
Taxa named by Carl Linnaeus